The Sri Lanka national women's cricket team travelled to the West Indies prior to the 2010 ICC Women's World Twenty20 that was being there to play a two-match One Day International (ODI) series, and a three-match Twenty20 International (T20I) series against the West Indies women's cricket team.

WODI series

1st WODI

2nd WODI

WT20I series

1st WT20I

2nd WT20I

3rd WT20I

References

Sri Lanka 2010
International cricket competitions in 2010
2010 in women's cricket
2010 in Saint Kitts and Nevis
West Indies 2010
2010 in West Indian cricket
2010 in Sri Lankan cricket